Artur Barciś (born 12 August 1956) is a Polish actor. His television appearances include  Krzysztof Kieślowski's anthology series Dekalog (1989), the soap opera Aby do świtu... (1992), and Kurierzy ("Couriers"). From 2006 to 2016 he played the lovably neurotic Arkadiusz Czerepach in the comedy series Ranczo ("The Ranch").

In 2011, he and Ranczo co-star Cezary Żak starred in Dziwna para, a Polish adaptation of Neil Simon's Broadway theatre play The Odd Couple.

Biography 
Graduated from the High School in Rudniki and the PWSFTviT in Lodz in 1979. He was an actor at the Targówek Theater (1979-1981) and the National Theater (1982-1984). Since 1984 he has been an actor at the Ateneum Theater in Warsaw. He gained popularity for his performances in the show Pankracy's Window, intended for young audiences. In the late 1990s, he gained popularity among TV viewers thanks to one of the leading roles in the TV series Miodowe lata, where he played the role of Tadeusz Norek. He has gained recognition among viewers by playing both comedic and dramatic roles.

In 2010, he was a participant in the eleventh edition of the TVN entertainment program Dancing with the Stars. During the seventh episode, he withdrew from the competition due to a leg injury.

Private life 
His wife is Beata Dorota Barciś (born August 8, 1962), a film editor. They have a son Franciszek (born 1989), who played the role of young Adasio Miauczyński in Marek Koterski's Nic śmieszny (1995) and a small role in the TV series Honey Years. In September 2021, he announced that he had apostasized.

He was a member of the honorary support committee of Bronislaw Komorowski before the 2010 fast-track presidential election and before the 2015 Polish presidential election. He supports the Raków Częstochowa soccer club.

External links

References

1956 births
Living people
People from Częstochowa County
20th-century Polish male actors
21st-century Polish male actors
Polish male television actors
Polish male soap opera actors